Jagger Jones (born July 29, 2002) is an American professional racing driver. He is set to compete in Indy NXT for Cape Motorsports in 2023. Jones previously competed in the U.S. F2000 National Championship with Cape Motorsports. He also competed in what is now the ARCA Menards Series West full-time in 2019, driving the No. 6 Ford for Sunrise Ford Racing.

He is the grandson of 1963 Indianapolis 500 winner Parnelli Jones and the son of former NASCAR, CART, and sports car driver P. J. Jones.

Racing career
Jones began racing go-karts at the age of nine in both the United States and in Europe.  He made his late model debut for JR Motorsports at Myrtle Beach Speedway in June 2018, a race he went on to win. He later drove two more races for JRM, competing at South Boston Speedway in July and Hickory Motor Speedway in September. Jones won five races at Kern County Raceway Park in 2018, winning the track's NASCAR Whelen All-American Late Model Championship.

On January 29, 2019, it was announced that Jones would move up to the NASCAR K&N Pro Series West to drive Sunrise Ford Racing's No. 6 Ford. He expressed confidence at the beginning of the season, saying, "I'm going to do my best to use my experience to win some races." Jones nearly won on debut at the Dirt Track at Las Vegas Motor Speedway, leading with one lap remaining before being passed by Hailie Deegan while navigating lapped traffic in turns one and two. Despite being moved out of the bottom lane, Jones held no ill will against Deegan's last-lap move, saying, "I think her move was fine...she didn't really do anything too bad. It's just the lapped car cut me off in front. It just pushed me up the track." Jones also drove the NORRA 1000 off-road race in Mexico during 2019.

Despite finishing second in points, winning rookie of the year, and winning one race during the 2019 season in the West Series, Jones did not choose to continue to race with Bruncati's team for the 2020 season.

After not committing to a West Series ride for the beginning of the 2020 season, Jones raced in the NASCAR Advance Auto Parts Weekly Series late models at Irwindale Speedway.

On November 2, 2021, it was announced that Jones would make his open-wheel racing debut in the U.S. F2000 National Championship driving for Cape Motorsports in 2022.

On September 7, 2022, Cape Motorsports announced that Jones would move up the Road to Indy ladder to Indy NXT in 2023.

Personal life
Jones is a third generation driver. His grandfather, Parnelli, won the 1963 Indianapolis 500, while his father, P. J., raced in NASCAR, CART, and sports cars, winning the 1993 24 Hours of Daytona. He is an alumnus of Notre Dame Preparatory High School in Scottsdale, Arizona. Jones is a Dean's List Business major at High Point University, NC. Jones has a younger sibling, Jace, who also races.

Racing record

Career summary 

*Season still in progress.

† As he  was a guest driver, he Jones was ineligible to score points.

NASCAR 
(key) (Bold – Pole position awarded by qualifying time. Italics – Pole position earned by points standings or practice time. * – Most laps led.)

K&N Pro Series West

American open-wheel racing results

U.S. F2000 National Championship 
(key) (Races in bold indicate pole position) (Races in italics indicate fastest lap) (Races with * indicate most race laps led)

Indy NXT
(key) (Races in bold indicate pole position) (Races in italics indicate fastest lap) (Races with L indicate a race lap led) (Races with * indicate most race laps led)

References

External links
 
 

2002 births
Living people
Sportspeople from Scottsdale, Arizona
Racing drivers from Arizona
Racing drivers from Phoenix, Arizona
NASCAR drivers
Indy Lights drivers
U.S. F2000 National Championship drivers